Charlie Louise Wellings (born 18 May 1998) is an English professional footballer who plays as a striker for Women's Super League club Reading. Wellings has previously played for Birmingham City and Bristol City of the FA Women's Super League and Celtic of the Scottish Women's Premier League.

Club career

Birmingham City
On 24 March 2015, Wellings signed her first senior contract at Birmingham City WFC. Wellings made her debut on 2 July 2014 during a WSL Cup match against Oxford United, coming on as a 75th-minute substitute replacing Karen Carney. Wellings did not make her league debut until the 2015 FA WSL where she started against Liverpool F.C. Women in a 2–1 loss. Wellings' first goal was in a 7–1 win against Aston Villa in the WSL Cup, scoring in the 91st minute.

In May 2017, she scored in Birmingham City's 4–1 2017 FA Women's Cup Final defeat by Manchester City at Wembley Stadium, the club's first ever goal at Wembley.

Bristol City
On 28 May 2019, Wellings left childhood club Birmingham and signed a pre-contract agreement with fellow FA WSL team Bristol City, the same day as Birmingham teammate Meaghan Sargeant. Bristol are managed by former Birmingham assistant Tanya Oxtoby. On 7 September 2019,Wellings made her debut for Bristol City W.F.C. in a 0-0 home draw against Brighton & Hove Albion in the FA WSL.

Celtic
Wellings signed for Celtic in July 2021. She made an impressive start to her career in Scotland; scoring twice in a 4–2 win over Aberdeen in the opening league match of the season on 5 September 2021, and by mid-October she had scored 11 goals in 10 games.

Reading
On 5 August 2022, Reading announced the double signing of Wellings.

International career 
In August 2018, Wellings represented England at the 2018 FIFA U-20 Women's World Cup. The team finished in third place, losing the semi-final to Japan before beating France on penalties in the third place playoff. It was the team's best ever result.  On 5 April, Wellings made her debut for the U21 team in a 2-1 win against France U23, where she scored both goals. Later that year in October, Wellings as well as fellow teammate Sophie Baggaley were called up to the England U21 team again.

Career statistics

Club

Honours 
Celtic

SWPL League Cup: 2022

References

External links
 Wellings' Bristol City player profile
Wellings' Soccerway profile

Birmingham City W.F.C. players
Women's association football forwards
Sportspeople from Walsall
Living people
1998 births
Women's Super League players
English women's footballers
Bristol City W.F.C. players
Celtic F.C. Women players
Scottish Women's Premier League players
Footballers from the West Midlands (county)